Kelaokalani Fifita "Kalani" Sitake (born October 10, 1975) is a Tongan–American football coach and former player.  He has been the head football coach at Brigham Young University (BYU) since December 2015, and is the first Tongan to become a collegiate football head coach. Sitake played college football as a fullback at BYU under coach LaVell Edwards, and graduated in 2000. Prior to becoming head coach at BYU, Sitake was the defensive coordinator and associate head coach at the University of Utah, and the defensive coordinator and associate head coach at Oregon State University.

Early life
Sitake was born in Tonga. His family emigrated to the United States when he was a child, living in Laie, Hawaii. He went to high school in Kirkwood, Missouri.

College career
Sitake began his BYU playing career in 1994 prior to serving a two-year mission for the Church of Jesus Christ of Latter-day Saints (LDS Church) to Oakland, California. After returning and redshirting in 1997, Sitake was a three-year starter at fullback for the Cougars from 1998–2000 under hall of famed BYU head coach LaVell Edwards. He was named BYU's Football Scholar Athlete of the Year in 1998, helped the Cougars to the first Mountain West Conference championship in 1999, and earned BYU's Impact Player of the Year in 1999. In 2000, Sitake was named team captain and BYU's most valuable running back. He completed his career amassing 373 yards rushing on 86 carries (4.3 yards per carry), and 536 yards receiving on 62 receptions for one touchdown.

Professional career

Cincinnati Bengals
Following his collegiate career, Sitake signed a free agent contract with the Cincinnati Bengals in 2001. His career ended due to a back injury.

Coaching career
Sitake got his start as an assistant coach during the 2001 season when he worked as the defensive backs coach and special teams coordinator at Eastern Arizona College.  In 2002, he returned to his alma mater, BYU, as a graduate assistant for the defense. From 2003 to 2004, he worked at Southern Utah University.  During the 2003 season, he was the running backs and tight ends coach; he coached the offensive line and tight ends during the 2004 season.

Sitake's tenure at the University of Utah started in 2005, where he coached the linebackers, until being promoted to defensive coordinator on December 7, 2008.  His formal duties began on January 3, 2009.  Sitake became the first native Tongan named as a defensive coordinator at an NCAA FBS school, following the resignation of the previous defensive coordinator, Gary Andersen.

On December 23, 2014, Oregon State University announced Sitake's hiring as the team's new defensive coordinator and Assistant Head Coach. This reunited Sitake with Oregon State's head coach, Andersen, whom Sitake had previously worked with at Utah.

On December 19, 2015, after Bronco Mendenhall left BYU to coach the Virginia Cavaliers, BYU named Sitake as the team's new head coach.

On September 3, 2016, Sitake's head coaching career began with BYU facing Arizona in the Cactus Kickoff in University of Phoenix Stadium in Glendale, AZ.  The Cougars won, 18–16. BYU then lost three games in a row to a 1–3 start. They then won four games in a row, including a road victory at Michigan State and a homecoming win against Mississippi State. Sitake eventually finished his first season 9–4, leading BYU to a 12th consecutive bowl game. The four losses were by a combined eight points.

Expectations were high for BYU heading into the 2017 season, despite the loss of many graduating seniors, including starting quarterback Taysom Hill and explosive running back Jamaal Williams. The loss of production proved to be detrimental, as the Cougars had their worst season in over 50 years, starting 1–7 before slogging to a 4–9 finish. After the season, Sitake fired offensive coordinator Ty Detmer due to the offense not delivering satisfactory production. He hired Jeff Grimes to replace Detmer. 

The 2018 season was a slight improvement over the previous year. It was defined by inconsistent success, with the highlight of the year being a massive upset victory over No. 6-ranked Wisconsin. However, the team continued to struggle, with an especially tough loss to Northern Illinois at home and blowing a 20-point lead at archrival Utah. Despite the lack of consistency for much of the season, a few silver linings were present. Sitake benched starting quarterback Tanner Mangum in favor of true freshman Zach Wilson. With Wilson at quarterback, the team won five of its final seven games to improve to 7–6, including a 49–18 win over Western Michigan in the Famous Idaho Potato Bowl, noted for Wilson's perfect passing performance (18-for-18, 317 yards, and 4 touchdowns).

Sitake's fourth season with the team restored higher expectations for the Cougars even with their first four games being against tough competition. BYU initially had success with upset wins over Power Five programs such as Tennessee and a ranked USC team, but inconsistency returned. Wilson regressed heavily, due to struggling to remain healthy, and missed five games due to a broken thumb. 2019 was defined by the depth at the quarterback position, though, as backups Jaren Hall and Baylor Romney both led BYU to wins late in the season to help get the team to the Hawai'i Bowl against the University of Hawai'i. However, they lost that game 38–34 in which Wilson returned and delivered mixed results. The team's final record was the same as the previous season's at 7–6.

Sitake did receive a contract extension from athletic director Tom Holmoe through the 2023 season. Going into his fifth season coaching the team, many questions lingered, such as the ability to deliver consistent success. The offseason began with a highly anticipated competition for the starting quarterback position between Wilson, Hall, and Romney. 

However, football operations were halted when nationwide lockdowns were implemented due to the COVID-19 pandemic. BYU was set to face another tough schedule, with opponents such as Utah, Michigan State, Arizona State, Minnesota, Missouri, and Stanford being highlights. All these games were cancelled due to the Power Five conferences largely opting to restrict games to within their leagues, leaving the Cougars with only three games. Holmoe gradually re-built the season by adding several teams on short notice, allowing the Cougars to play as many games as possible.

Wilson won back the starting job, and Sitake guided the team through the revamped schedule with massive success. The Cougars finished the 2020 season with an 11–1 record, defined by Wilson's resurgence in production. The team finished with a No. 11 national ranking in both the AP Top 25 poll and the Amway Coaches' Poll, their highest final ranking since 1996. It was also the team's first 11-game winning season since 2009, and their first one-loss season since 1996. Several players on the team, including Wilson, opted to forego their senior seasons and declare for the NFL Draft. Offensive coordinator Jeff Grimes departed BYU after the season, taking offensive line coach Eric Mateos with him to Baylor. Sitake promoted quarterbacks coach Aaron Roderick to replace Grimes.

In his sixth season as head coach at BYU, Sitake replaced Wilson with starting quarterback Jaren Hall. Following a 24–16 win against Arizona, BYU faced Utah for the first time since 2019. BYU entered the game as a 7-point underdog. However, BYU won the game 26–17 and ended the Utes 9-win streak against the Cougars with a strong defensive and offensive dominance.

Personal life 
Sitake is a member of the LDS Church. After his freshman year at BYU in 1994, Sitake served as a missionary in the California Oakland Mission. He has a bachelor's degree in English from BYU. He and his wife, Timberly, are the parents of four children.

Head coaching record

References

External links
 BYU profile

1975 births
Living people
American football fullbacks
BYU Cougars football players
BYU Cougars football coaches
Oregon State Beavers football coaches
Southern Utah Thunderbirds football coaches
Utah Utes football coaches
Junior college football coaches in the United States
People from Laie
People from Kirkwood, Missouri
People from Tongatapu
Sportspeople from St. Louis County, Missouri
Coaches of American football from Missouri
Players of American football from Missouri
Tongan emigrants to the United States
Tongan players of American football
American Mormon missionaries in the United States
Latter Day Saints from Hawaii
Latter Day Saints from Missouri
Tongan Latter Day Saints